Weapon of Choice is a band from Los Angeles fronted by bass player Lonnie Marshall. They play a mixture of rock, alternative, funk, hip hop, jazz and reggae which Marshall dubbed "Nutmeg". Others refer to their music as P-Funk style music.

The band was created after the breakup of Marshall's previous band 'Marshall Law' (which included his guitarist brother Arik Marshall, short-term member of Red Hot Chili Peppers in 1992-93). The band signed with Stone Gossard's record label Loosegroove after he saw a video for Marshall Law's Uppity Yuppity. The band went to Seattle and recorded their first album Nut-Meg Sez "Bozo the Town" which was released in 1994. They released two more albums with Loosegroove, Highperspice in 1996 and Nutmeg Phantasy in 1998. The later record was compilation released as benefit album for musical instruments in schools. When Loosegrove folded Weapon of Choice were left without a record company.

In 2002 they released Illoominutty (recorded in 1997) on Fishbone's independent label Nuttsactor 5. In 2004 Funk To The Max and Ter a Terre put out another compilation album Color Me Funky. Uno.

The band later dissolved going on to do their own own work, but even though they were a independent group that still had a following with George Clinton from Parliament Funkadelic calling the group “One of my favorites.”

Members
Lonnie "Meganut" Marshall (bass, lead vocals)
Spankie (vocals, bellydance, hiptonite)
Marc Rey (guitar)
Lamont Sydnor (drums)
Elizabeth Lea (trombone, vocals)
John Kirby (keys, talkbox)

Discography
Albums
Nut-Meg Sez "Bozo the Town" (1994) Loosegroove / Sony
Highperspice (1996)  Loosegroove / Sony 550
Nutmeg Phantasy (1998)  Loosegroove, Compil.
Illoominutty (2001) Nuttsactor 5
Color Me Funky (2003) Funk To The Max, Ter a Terre, Compil. and 3 new tracks
Meganut's WOC Party (2013)
rEAllyRelEVANt (2013)
tiMelESs (2013)

DVD
Uncut Nut: 1992-2006 - The Definitive DVD Collection

References

Further reading

External links
 
 

Musical groups established in 1992
American funk musical groups